Olfactomedin-like 2B is a protein that in humans is encoded by the OLFML2B gene.

References

Further reading 

 
 

Olfactomedins